Forensic Heroes (Traditional Chinese: 法證先鋒) is a TVB modern suspense series broadcast in June, 2006, starring Bobby Au-Yeung, Frankie Lam, Yoyo Mung, Linda Chung, Raymond Cho and Florence Kwok in the first instalment of the Forensic Heroes series.

A direct sequel, Forensic Heroes II (法證先鋒II), was produced and broadcast in 2008 with the same cast, alongside Kevin Cheng and Charmaine Sheh. Two additional indirect sequels were released in 2011 and 2020 with a new cast, and a fifth instalment is in development as of 2022.

In 2022, the drama was selected as one of the ten classic TVB dramas being honored for a new joint Youku and TVB program.

Synopsis
The plot for Forensic Heroes contains a mixture of various themes. The mysteries include "Who Killed Tim Sir's wife?", "The Tai Po Corpse", "Murders for Justice", and "Where is Tim Sir?". The series include many serial killers. However, of all the crimes, there were two very important ones.

"Who Killed Tim Sir's Wife?" had two possible suspects, however, the murderer turns out to be a nurse who accidentally poisoned the victim. This breaks Tim's heart, but it is still a lucky chance for him as he falls in love with Siu-Yau.

"Where is Tim Sir?" was the last and most important mystery. A clown, Tracy's only true friend, abducted Tim. The clown puts Tim in a port container with seemingly limited air and food supply, no water, and a camera connected to a laptop, stored in a disc. Every day, new clips are sent to Forensics that show Tim trying to create a fire to attract the rescuers using friction. But Forensics has only three days to find Tim before he dies of thirst and hunger. Siu-Yau is especially worried and fearful, as she has fallen in love with him. The clown is caught and brought to Forensics to be interrogated, but before any information is extracted from him, he commits suicide.

While Forensics is searching, Siu-Yau looks at the laptop screen with Sam. The lights light the container up dimly, and a small hole is seen on the container. This sparks new hope in Siu-Yau and Sam, who check the position of the sun and find out where Tim is. Still, that does not narrow Tim's location down enough. Tim is wearing a watch that could reflect sunlight coming through the hole and start a small fire, which the rescuers would see. They are unaware that Tim is waiting to die.

Tim sees his wife, Charlie, in a dream. She asks him what he is doing in the world of the dead. Tim says that he is ready to give up and leave the earth. However, Charlie tells him she is sure he can do it and leaves. He returns to reality for a short moment, but is soon back in the dream.

This time, Tim dreams of his true love, Siu-Yau. He says he is tired of suffering on earth, but Siu-Yau holds his hands and tells him others are waiting for him, and he has to pull through. This gives Tim enough confidence to raise his arm to the sunlight, and start a fire. The Air Force, which is helping to find Tim Sir, finds him in a container. Tim is hospitalized, and he tells Siu-Yau that his vision of her made him keep on going rather than giving up. Siu-Yau rejects Tim. Ding-Ding and Sam decide to buy a house together and is it there that Sam proposes to Ding-Ding. There is a party to celebrate the wedding of Ding-Ding and Sam. There, Siu-Yau finally faces her true feelings for the man she loves and accepts a date from Tim. Just then, Tim and Sam's phones ring, and they are called off for a case.

Cast

Main cast

Other cast

Guest starring

Viewership ratings

See also
Forensic Heroes (TV series)

References

External links
TVB.com Forensic Heroes - Official Website 

TVB dramas
2006 Hong Kong television series debuts
2006 Hong Kong television series endings